José Alfredo Poyatos López (born 27 November 1964) is a retired football midfielder.

Club career
Poyatos played for local sides Chorrillo and Tauro and in El Salvador for Cojutepeque where he played alongside compatriots Rubén Guevara, René Mendieta and Percival Piggott.

International career
Poyatos made his debut for Panama in a May 1986 friendly match against the Dominican Republic and has earned over 20 caps. He represented his country in 8 FIFA World Cup qualification matches and played at the 1993 and 1997 UNCAF Nations Cup as well as the 1993 CONCACAF Gold Cup.

His final international was an April 1997 UNCAF Nations Cup match against El Salvador.

Managerial career
Poyatos was named manager of Tauro in 2000 and returned to the club in August 2004. He was Atlético Veragüense boss in 2006 and at Árabe Unido in 2007. He became assistant at the national team in January 2010 and in February 2011 he took charge of the Panama national under-20 football team.

In August 2013 he returned at the helm at Chorrillo and he was appointed by second division Millenium UP in January 2014. In summer 2014 he rejoined Tauro as an assistant to Jorge Dely Valdés, later replacing Valdés only to leave the club in March 2015.

References

1964 births
Living people
Sportspeople from Panama City
Association football defenders
Panamanian footballers
Panama international footballers
1993 CONCACAF Gold Cup players
1993 UNCAF Nations Cup players
1997 UNCAF Nations Cup players
Unión Deportivo Universitario players
Tauro F.C. players
C.D. Plaza Amador players
Panamanian expatriate footballers
Expatriate footballers in El Salvador
Panamanian football managers
Chorrillo F.C. managers
Tauro F.C. managers